Domen may refer to:

Places
Domën, a village in Kryevidh commune, Tirana county, Albania
Dömen, Bozdoğan, a village in Bozdoğan district, Aydın province, Turkey
Domen, Norway, a mountain in Vardø municipality, Finnmark county
Domen Butte, a butte in the Borg Massif of Queen Maud Land, Antarctica
Hen Domen, the site of a medieval timber motte-and-bailey castle in Powys, Wales
Y Domen Fawr, a scheduled monument in Blaenau Gwent, Wales

People
Domen Črnigoj (born 1995), Slovenian professional football player
Domen Lorbek (born 1985), Slovenian professional basketball player
Domen Pociecha (born 1985), Slovenian luger
Domen Prevc (born 1999), Slovenian ski jumper

Other
DoMEn, the company that owns the .me tlD.